Psilogramma anne is a moth in the family Sphingidae. It is found in Papua New Guinea.

References

Psilogramma
Moths described in 2001
Endemic fauna of Papua New Guinea